Payne Creek is a stream in Hardee County and Polk County, Florida, in the United States.

Payne Creek has the name of a pioneer family who lived there.

See also
List of rivers of Florida

References

Rivers of Hardee County, Florida
Rivers of Polk County, Florida
Rivers of Florida